The genus Mantis is in the family Mantidae, of the mantis order Mantodea.

Some of its species have the common name "praying mantis".

Species
Mantis is a small genus of mantises, which includes 9 species (others are synonyms):
 Mantis beieri Roy, 1999 – Democratic Republic of the Congo
 Mantis callifera Wood-Mason, 1882
 Mantis carinata Cosmovici, 1888
 Mantis dilaticollis Gistel, 1856
 Mantis emortualis Saussure, 1869
 Mantis griveaudi Paulian, 1958
 Mantis insignis Beier, 1954 – Angola, Guinea, Congo
 Mantis macroalata Lindt, 1973 – Tajikistan
 Mantis macrocephala Lindt, 1974 – Tajikistan
 Mantis octospilota Westwood, 1889 — "eight-spotted mantis", or "blackbarrel mantid", Australia
 Mantis pia Serville, 1839
 Mantis religiosa (Linnaeus, 1758) — European mantis, or "praying mantis"
 Mantis splendida de Haan, 1842
 Mantis tricolor Linne, 1767

See also
African mantises — in other genera.
European mantis
List of mantis genera and species (incomplete)

References

External links

 
Mantodea genera
Mantidae
Taxa named by Carl Linnaeus